Arts and Media School Islington, is a secondary school located in the Finsbury Park area of the London Borough of Islington. It is classified as a comprehensive trust foundation school and has been a specialist media arts college since 2003. Susan Service was appointed headteacher in 2016 after having served as the deputy head of curriculum for 5 years.

History 
The Victorian building, still in use today, was originally Montem St School. Later the school was known as Tollington Park Secondary School and, more recently, as George Orwell School. The school was renamed as Islington Arts and Media School (IAMS) in the school year 1999–2000. Initially, Torsten Friedag was appointed as a "super head" but quit after two terms. Richard Ewen was appointed as headteacher and improvements in the school resulted in a 2004 Ofsted report that read: "Islington Arts and Media school is an effective and rapidly improving school that provides a good quality of education and good value for money." The Ofsted report on the school in 2017 described the school's performance as "Good".

The school buildings were used as a filming location in the Academy Award-nominated 2006 film Notes on a Scandal.

Partnerships
Partners vary from across the curriculum and include The Barbican and Arsenal FC. In addition, the school works closely with a number of local primary schools, sharing skills and expertise in key academic subjects. Each term they open their doors to their primary partners, offering a variety of master classes, workshops, and activity days.

Notable former pupils
 Jermain Jackman, winner of the third series of the BBC television singing competition The Voice UK in 2014
 Don McCullin, photo journalist who attended the school in the late 1940s
Justin Pickett, actor who played Sean Ambrose in the Channel 4 comedy Desmond's, attended the school in the 1980s
 Kaya Scodelario, actress
 Jay Simpson, professional footballer
 Troy Titus-Adams, actress
 Most of the members of Afroswing group NSG

References

Secondary schools in the London Borough of Islington
Foundation schools in the London Borough of Islington
Specialist arts colleges in England